Countess Elisabeth of Nassau-Siegen (1488 – 3 June 1559), official titles: Gräfin zu Nassau, Vianden und Diez, was a countess from the House of Nassau-Siegen, a cadet branch of the Ottonian Line of the House of Nassau, and through marriage Countess of Wied.

Biography
Elisabeth was born in 1488 as the eldest daughter and fifth child of Count John V of Nassau-Siegen and his wife Landgravine Elisabeth of Hesse-Marburg.

Elisabeth married in February 1506 to Count  (1485 – 18 May 1533). It was a double wedding, on the same day Elisabeth’s younger sister Mary married to Count Jobst I of Holstein-Schauenburg-Pinneberg. A banquet was also held in the city hall in Siegen at which both brides and grooms were present. The feast with the city magistrates was paid for by the brides’ father and the city council donated 16 oxen and 19 pigs for the feast. On 16 February 1506, the ʻBeilagerʼ of the two sisters was celebrated in Dillenburg with the greatest of festivities. The purchase of gold fabric for 747 guilders and silk fabric for 396 guilders at the trade fair in Mainz for these celebrations and the wedding of their brother William in Koblenz in May 1506, as well as the unusually high total expenditure of 13,505 guilders in the accounts of 1505/1506, show that these weddings must have been splendid events.

Elisabeth’s husband was the son of Count Frederick IV and Countess Agnes of Virneburg. John succeeded his father together with his brother William III, who relinquished all his rights to the County of Wied to John in 1505. The year later John’s brothers, who were clergymen, also renounced their rights to him. Elisabeth’s mother-in-law was a niece of Countess Genoveva of Virneburg, who was married to Count Henry II of Nassau-Siegen, Elisabeth’s great uncle. Elisabeth’s husband died in 1533 and was succeeded by their son John IV.

Elisabeth’s brother-in-law archbishop Herman V of Cologne tried in vain to bring the Archbishopric of Cologne to the Reformation, but had then been deposed by papal bull. He then went to Siegen to seek the advice of Elisabeth’s brother Count William I ‘the Rich’ of Nassau-Siegen, and asked him to put in a good word for him with Emperor Charles V. With the Wied Family, the archbishop spent several weeks in Siegen.

Elisabeth died in Dillenburg on 3 June 1559, where she no doubt was to attend the triple wedding of her nephew John and nieces Anne and Elisabeth.

Issue
From the marriage of Elisabeth and John the following children were born:
 Philip (? – 1535).
 Count John IV (? – 15 June 1581), succeeded his father as Count of Wied in 1533. He married in February 1543 to Countess  (26 March 1525 – after 15 June 1581).
 Frederick (? – 23 December 1568), was elected archbishop Frederick IV of Cologne on 19 November 1562, resigned in 1567.
  (? – 5 August 1571). She married:
 on 29 September 1523 to Count Bernhard of Bentheim-Steinfurt (? – 1528).
 in 1534 to Count Arnold of Manderscheid-Blankenheim (14 November 1500 – 6 May 1548).
 Walpurga (? – 3 October 1578), married in 1528 to Count Louis of Stolberg-Königstein (Stolberg, 13 January 1505 – Wertheim, 24 August 1574).
 Agnes (? – Sonnewalde, 24 March 1588). She married:
 in Siegen, 28 August 1539 to Count Caspar of Mansfeld-Hinterort (? – in Hungary, 26 October 1542).
 in Dierdorf on 11 July 1545 to Count Frederick Magnus of Solms-Laubach (1 October 1521 – Laubach, 13 January 1561).
 Genoveva (? – 26 June 1556), married in 1546 to Count  (Stolberg, 1 October 1501 – Allstedt, 8 March 1552).
 Mary (? – 15 March 1563), married on 1 September 1554 to Christoph Reichserbschenk, Semperfrei und Herr zu Limpurg-Gaildorf (12 July 1541 – Obersontheim, 3 September 1574).
 Elisabeth (? – 24 July 1542), married in 1522 to Count  (1501 – 1560).

Ancestors

Notes

References

Sources
 
 
 
 
 
 
 
 
 
 
 
 
  (1882). Het vorstenhuis Oranje-Nassau. Van de vroegste tijden tot heden (in Dutch). Leiden: A.W. Sijthoff/Utrecht: J.L. Beijers.

External links
 Nassau. In: Medieval Lands. A prosopography of medieval European noble and royal families, by Charles Cawley.
 Nassau Part 4. In: An Online Gotha, by Paul Theroff.
 Runkel, Wied & Leiningen-Westerburg. In: An Online Gotha, by Paul Theroff.

|-

1488 births
1559 deaths
Elisabeth of Nassau-Siegen
Elisabeth of Nassau-Siegen
∞|Elisabeth of Nassau-Siegen
15th-century German women
16th-century German women